South Dakota Highway 45 is a state highway that runs north to south across much of central South Dakota, United States. The northern terminus is at the North Dakota border as a continuation of North Dakota Highway 3, and runs south to South Dakota Highway 44 at Platte.

Route description

History
SD 45 was established around 1927. The southern terminus was at the intersection of present-day SD 50 and County Road 49 (CR 49) and the northern terminus was at the intersection of SD 10 in Leola.

By 1932, it was extended south along what was part of SD 47 to Wheeler. By 1936, SD 45 was truncated at Kimball, at US 16, as US 281 supplanted the SD 45 designation to the south. In the early 1950s, when US 281 was relocated several miles to the east, SD 45 was extended back south to SD 50.

Around 1970, SD 50 had been realigned to intersect SD 44 west of Platte, and SD 45 was extended south along the old alignment to Platte, where it remains today.

The north end of the route has remained in its current configuration since 1936.

Major intersections

See also

 List of state highways in South Dakota

References

External links

 South Dakota Highways Page: Highways 31-60

045
Transportation in Charles Mix County, South Dakota
Transportation in Brule County, South Dakota
Transportation in Buffalo County, South Dakota
Transportation in Hand County, South Dakota
Transportation in Faulk County, South Dakota
Transportation in Edmunds County, South Dakota
Transportation in McPherson County, South Dakota